Tsintaosaurini is a tribe of basal lambeosaurine hadrosaurs native to Eurasia. It is thought to contains the genera Tsintaosaurus (from  China), Pararhabdodon (from Spain) and Koutalisaurus (also from Spain), though some studies have questioned its existence as a natural grouping.

Classification
Tsintaosaurini is part of the family Hadrosauridae, specifically the subfamily Lambeosaurinae. The existence of a tsintaosaur clade of lambeosaurines was first recognized by palaeontologists Albert Prieto-Márquez and Johnathan R. Wagner, who in 2009 published a paper recognizing a phylogenetic relationship between Tsintaosaurus and Pararhabdodon based both on shared anatomical traits and a phylogenetic analysis. A 2013 study by Prieto-Márquez corroborated the existence of this grouping, and coined the tribe Tsintaosaurini to refer to it. The type genus is Tsintaosaurus, and it was defined as the smallest clade containing Tsintaosaurus spinorhinus and Pararhabdodon isonensis. Several studies since have corroborated the existence of the clade, though some others have failed to recover it, instead finding the two genera in a polytomy of basal lambeosaurs. A 2021 paper by Daniel Madzia and other ornithischian researchers, focused on a revising ornithischian nomenclature and converting existing group names into Phylocode-compliant clades, re-formalized the coining of Tsintaosaurini and revised its definition to be the most inclusive group including T. spinorhinus and P. isonensis, but not Aralosaurus tuberiferus, Lambeosaurus lambei, or Parasaurolophus walkeri. The following cladogram shows the results of a phylogenetic analysis of hadrosaur relationships from a 2022 study:

A 2020 study by Nick Longrich and colleagues describing the genus Ajnabia found Pararhabdodon to be part a monophyletic clade of European lambeosaurs, termed Arenysaurini, rather than a relative of Tsintaosaurus, thereby making the tribe an inapplicable polyphyletic grouping. The cladogram from their study's phylogenetic analysis is shown below:

See also
 Timeline of hadrosaur research

References

Lambeosaurines